The men's sprint cross-country skiing competition at the FIS Nordic World Ski Championships 2007 was held on 22 February 2007 in the Sapporo Dome.

Results

Qualification
83 competitors started the qualification race.

Quarterfinals
Q - Qualified for next round
PF - Photo Finish
LL - Lucky Loser - qualified for next round due to their times

Quarterfinal 1

Quarterfinal 2

Quarterfinal 3

Quarterfinal 4

Quarterfinal 5

Semifinals
Semifinal 1

Semifinal 2

Finals

 Final A

 Final B

References

External links
Qualification results
Final results

FIS Nordic World Ski Championships 2007